Ballymote is a Gaelic Athletic Association club based in the town and parish of Ballymote in County Sligo, Republic of Ireland 

James Kearins led Ballymote to the 1996 Sligo Intermediate Football Championship title before being appointed manager of the Sligo county team in 2003.

Honours

 Sligo Senior Football Championship:
1892, 1905, 1913, 1925, 1948
 Sligo Intermediate Football Championship:
1993, 1996, 2003
 Sligo Junior Football Championship:
(Derroon - 1935, 1945), 2017 
 Sligo Under 20 Football Championship:
2003, 2006
 Sligo Minor Football Championship:
1949, 1960, 2003
 Sligo Under-16 Football Championship:
2001
 Sligo Junior Football League (Division 5):
2003, 2008
 Kiernan Cup:
2003, 2004
 Benson Cup:
1992
 Abbott Cup:
2010, 2018

References

Gaelic games clubs in County Sligo